Carson Chamberlain (born in Berea, Kentucky) is an American songwriter, record producer and session musician who works mainly in the field of country music.

He worked as a bandleader and steel guitarist for Keith Whitley until Whitley died in 1989. Afterward, he worked as a touring manager for Alan Jackson and Clint Black. Chamberlain became an A&R director at Mercury Nashville in 1994, but later retired from that position. He has also worked as a record producer for several Mercury acts, including Mark Wills, Billy Currington and Easton Corbin.

Chamberlain co-wrote the songs "Love's Got a Hold on You", "Everything I Love" and "Between the Devil and Me" for Jackson; "The Best Day" for George Strait; and "Walk a Little Straighter" and "I Got a Feelin'" for Currington.

References

American country songwriters
American male songwriters
American country record producers
Pedal steel guitarists
People from Berea, Kentucky
Living people
Country musicians from Kentucky
Songwriters from Kentucky
Guitarists from Kentucky
American male guitarists
Record producers from Kentucky
Year of birth missing (living people)